Mojahedin of the Islamic Revolution of Iran Organization (MIRO) is a reformist political organization in Iran. It is a small yet influential organization, and participates in political activities similar to a political party. Historian Ervand Abrahamian referred to the group as "a circle of intellectuals and technocrats radical in economic policies but relatively liberal in cultural matters."

Platform 
The organization's platform has socialist tendencies. Its charter explicitly states that those who are in politics must be pious and the Guardianship of the Islamic Jurist is the best system of governance during the occultation.

According to Muhammad Sahimi, "One main weakness of the IRMO is perhaps its somewhat rigid ideological thinking. Its members view most issues, even membership in the organization, from an ideological perspective. In the author's opinion, this has hindered its development as a full-fledged political party. Its membership is limited, and they have few offices or organizations in the provinces."

Ban 

Following 2009 post-poll protests, the government suspended the party along with the Islamic Iran Participation Front in April 2010. In November 2011, the interior ministry declared that the party is unable to run for parliament seats in the 2012 elections because its license is revoked.

References

External links
Official Website (Persian)

1991 establishments in Iran
Banned political parties in Iran
Banned socialist parties
Islamic socialist political parties
Political parties established in 1991
Reformist political groups in Iran
Socialist parties in Iran